Sinefekt is a post-production complex based in Istanbul, Turkey. Hence the name, besides the Kodak Imagecare quality film laboratories, agency provides offline and online editing suites and leading color grading services. In addition, Sinefekt supplies 3D animation and VFX services on its studios. The works include mostly feature films and TV commercials. Sinefekt has won the title of "Best Editing" in 43rd Antalya Golden Orange Film Festival with films Takva and Climates. Its clients include Türk Telekom.

Administration 
Osman Alkan is the president and Melek Tiftik is customer relations director.

Sinefekt

Television and film post-production companies
Film production companies of Turkey